Feldkirchen in Kärnten is a town in the Austrian state of Carinthia and the capital of the district of the same name. It consists of the Katastralgemeinden Fasching, Feldkirchen, Glanhofen, Gradisch, Hoefling, Klein Sankt Veit, Pernegg, Rabensdorf, Sankt Ulrich, Sittich, Tschwarzen and Waiern. The name Feldkirchen means the church in the fields.

Geography

Location
Feldkirchen is located on the northern edge of the Klagenfurt Basin at the junction of the federal highways (Bundesstraßen) B 93 Gurktal Straße toward Friesach, B 94 Ossiacher Straße to Villach and B 95 Turracher Straße to Klagenfurt.

Waters
Both the Glan river and the small Tiebel, main inflow of Lake Ossiach, run through the town.

There are three lakes in the vicinity to Feldkirchen
 The Lake of Flatschach (Flatschacher See)
 The Lake of Dietrichstein (Dietrichsteiner See)
 The Lake of Maltschach (Maltschacher See)

Neighbouring municipalities

History
The settlement may have developed at the site of the former Beliandrum mansio along the Roman road from Teurnia near Spittal an der Drau to Virunum, capital of the Noricum province. A Roman tombstone of the 2nd century is included into the walls of the Saint Michael filial church. The earliest mention of Feldkirchen is as Ueldchiricha ("Church in the Fields") in an 888 document by Arnulf of Carinthia. The parish church Maria im Dorn, a Romanesque basilica with a Carolingian choir, is one of the oldest sacred buildings in Carinthia.

Feldkirchen, once an estate of the Eppenstein noble family, was bequeathed to the Diocese of Bamberg in 1166. The bishops had the Amthof erected, the former seat of the local administration, today a place for cultural events and a small museum. Finally Maria Theresa of Austria acquired Feldkirchen in 1759. The village of Markstein south of the town centre is a former checkpoint at the border between the Austrian Empire and the Upper Carinthian part of the short-lived Napoleonic Illyrian Provinces. The building of a customs station and a border stone remained. Feldkirchen received town privileges in 1930.

Demographics
According to the 2001 census, Feldkirchen has 14,030 inhabitants. Of that, 77.1% admit themselves to the Roman Catholic Church, 12.0% are Evangelist, 0.8% belong to the Orthodox Church, and 5.1% are Muslims. 2.0% are non-religious.

Sights
 Catholic parish church Maria im Dorn
 Catholic church St. Michael
 Catholic church St. Martin
 Catholic church St. Ulrich
 Amthof
 Antoniusheim

Gallery

Politics
Seats in the municipal assembly (Gemeinderat) as of 2015 elections:
Social Democratic Party of Austria (SPÖ): 14
Austrian People's Party (ÖVP): 10
Freedom Party of Austria (FPÖ): 3
Greens: 2
FePlus: 2

International relations

Twin towns — sister cities
Feldkirchen in Kärnten is twinned with:
  Bamberg, Germany, since 1993
  Ahrensburg, Germany, since 1998

Notable residents

 Otto Maria Polley (1910–1984), writer
 Sven Klimbacher, ice hockey player
 Siegfried Grabner, snowboarder
 Herbert Gantschacher, director, producer, writer

References

Cities and towns in Feldkirchen District